Ware Neck is an unincorporated community in Gloucester County, in the U. S. state of Virginia. Ware Neck has a post office with ZIP code 23178.

Lowland Cottage and the Ware Neck Store and Post Office are listed on the National Register of Historic Places.

References

Unincorporated communities in Virginia
Unincorporated communities in Gloucester County, Virginia